Dankook Middle School is a boys-only middle school located in Daechi-dong, Gangnam-gu, Seoul. It is a private school attached to Dankook University. It was first founded on December 26, 1983. The school motto is to “know myself, live with virtue, and study while working”. The school's symbol tree, flower, and mascot is the zelkova, the royal azalea, and the bear, respectively.

Principals
   1959 ~ 1964 1st Sung Girl Jung (정성걸)
   1964 ~ 1964 2nd Bong Shik Jang (장봉식)
   1964 ~ 1965 3rd Dong Shik Ji (지동식)
   1965 ~ 1968 4th Jong Hub Lee (이종업)
   1968 ~ 1969 5th Bong Shik Jang (장봉식)
   1969 ~ 1972 6th Bok Young Lee (이복녕)
   1972 ~ 1977 7th Jong Duck Yey (이종덕)
   1977 ~ 1990 8th Bok Young Lee (이복녕)
   1990 ~ 2004 9th Bong Shik Jang (장봉식)
   2004 ~ 2006 10th Hun Sang Shin (신헌상)
   2006 ~ 2008 11th Hun Suek Min (민헌숙)
   2008 ~ 2012 12th Sang Sue Kim (김상수)

Awards
12th National Astronomy Olympiad, gold medal
3rd Asian-Atlantic Astronomy Olympiad, 1st
Other Olympiad awards 54, the best in the country
4th long-basketball tournament, 1st
62nd middle school girls and boys basketball, 1st
54 other Olympiad awards

Student exchange
In spring, around 40 students from Buensan Middle School come to Dankook Middle School, while in the fall around 40 Dankook students go to Buensan middle school for two days.

School Symbol
The school symbol derives from the Obangsaek, a traditional Korean color spectrum. It has red, blue, black, and white colors around a yellow centerpiece containing letter for “middle”. Red represents a phoenix; blue, a blue dragon; white, a white tiger; and black, a turtle. The yellow in the middle represents the yellow dragon: a symbol for the school’s students, while the Chinese character means that Dankook students should be at the center of the world.

See also
Education in South Korea

External links 
 Dankook Middle School homepage 

Education in Seoul
Middle schools in South Korea
Educational institutions established in 1941
Gangnam District
1941 establishments in Korea